Brad Meltzer's Decoded (or simply Decoded) was an American investigation  television series focused on historical mysteries and alleged conspiracy theories, produced by Go Go Luckey and Berman/Braun, that premiered December 2, 2010, on the History channel. The series is hosted by Brad Meltzer, an author of political thriller novels and non-fiction works, and follows a team of investigators who try to determine the meanings behind various symbolism, alleged secret codes and conspiracies that surround us every day. History Decoded, a book by Meltzer that was inspired by the show, was published in October 2013.

Cast
 Brad Meltzer – author and investigator
 Scott Rolle – U.S. Army Reserves LTC and trial judge
Christine McKinley – mechanical engineer and writer
Buddy Levy – English professor, author and journalist

Reception
The New York Times reviewer Ginia Bellfante gave Decoded a critical review, writing, "[there] are the languorous crackpots who wonder if codes are embedded in their Home Depot receipts, or if George Washington's wooden leg hid an alternate Constitution. It is for this group that the series Brad Meltzer's Decoded has been conceived" but says, "Decoded, though, at least returns the History channel to history" after its forays into reality TV such as Ice Road Truckers and Ax Men.

PopMatters.com compares aspects of Decoded to Conspiracy Theory with Jesse Ventura stating it has "some broadly questionable research and conclusions, all developed and pursued 'in the moment', to give Decoded that sort of you-are-there-for-this-grand-adventure feel."

Episodes

Season 1 (2010–11)

Season 2 (2011–12)

References

External links

English-language television shows
History (American TV channel) original programming
2010 American television series debuts
2012 American television series endings
Brad Meltzer
American male novelists